Pulang Pisau (abbreviated: PPS), a sub-district in the district of Kahayan Hilir, is the regency seat of Pulang Pisau Regency and also one of the towns in Central Kalimantan. This town is at a distance of 91 km southeast of Palangka Raya city, the capital of Central Kalimantan Province. The population of this town is approximately 6,806 people as of 2021.

Demographics 
As of 2021, the population of Pulang Pisau town is about 6,806 inhabitants which represents 20.87% of the population of Kahayan Hilir district and 5% of the entire population of Pulang Pisau Regency. The population density of this town is 1,192 people/km² which one of the highest amongst towns in Central Kalimantan. This town has 2,479 households and the average household size of this town is 2.7 people. The sex ratio of Pulang Pisau town is 104 which means there are 104 males to every 100 females.

Geography  

Pulang Pisau town is located at the southeastern portion of Central Kalimantan. To be precise, this town is located at 2.748170 south and 114.258275 east. This town is located at eastern-to-southeastern corner of Pulang Pisau Regency. Pulang Pisau town is located to the southeast of Palangka Raya city as the capital of Central Kalimantan at a distance of 91 km. The total area of Pulang Pisau town is about 5.71 km² which makes it roughly 1.59% of the total area of Kahayan Hilir district and roughly 0.06% of the entire area of Pulang Pisau Regency. 

Due to its location that within the Kahayan river basin, this town is situated on the riverbank of Kahayan river. Pulang Pisau town is also situated on the lowlands of the southern portion of Central Kalimantan with the altitude being somewhere between 5 to 20 metres above sea level. This town experiences tropical rainforest climate (Af) with high amounts of precipitation most of the year, constantly high humidity, and persistent warm-to-hot temperature.

Education 
Pulang Pisau town as of 2021 has seven kindergartens (one public kindergarten and six private kindergartens), eight public primary schools, one public middle school, one private high school, and one private vocational school.

Public facilities 
For healthcare facility, Pulang Pisau town currently has one medical centre/polyclinic, one public health centre, five pharmacies, and served by one general hospital in the neighbouring sub-district of Mantaren I. For economic, trade, and accommodation facilities, this town recently has three markets, one shopping complex, 52 grocery shops, one restaurant, 55 food stalls/cafes, four banks, three cooperatives, and four inns. For religious facility, this town has ten Islamic religious facilities and six churches.

Reference 

Populated places in Central Kalimantan
Regency seats of Central Kalimantan
Pulang Pisau Regency